Jam9 is a Japanese band formed in 2003 and currently signed with the record company Dreamusic, Inc. It is based in Hamamatsu. Their music is mostly hip-hop. They began by playing at local music bars and released several records independently before signing with Dreamusic. Their first album with a major label, Kizuna (2011), reached number 77 on the Oricon album chart. In 2009, a song from their indie album, Rookie Players, served as a tie-in song for the J League team Shimizu S-Pulse's summer home game events.

Members 
  – MC
  – MC
  – DJ

References

External links 
Official Site 

Japanese rock music groups
Japanese hip hop groups
2003 establishments in Japan
Musical groups established in 2003
Musical groups from Shizuoka Prefecture
Dreamusic artists